Pandit Tushar Dutta (Bengali: তুষার দত্ত, Urdu:تشار دتہ, Hindi: तुषार दत्त) is a Hindustani classical music vocalist.

Early life
Tushar was born in Natore, Bangladesh. He started learning the fundamentals of Indian classical music from Bimal Mitra of Durgapur at an early age. He joined the ITC Sangeet Research Academy in 1983 and took Taalim under Arkut Kannabhirham and Arun Bhaduri in Kirana Gharana. He also took Taalim in Agra Gharana under K G Ginde and Sunil Bose and also from Subhra Guha. By blending the two musical styles Kirana and Agra Gharana he has made a unique style of his own.

Career
Tushar is a Top Grade vocalist in All India Radio and Doordarshan India. In 1998, He stood first in Khayal at All India University competition in Banaras. He has received the title of "Surmani" from Sur Sringar Samsad of Mumbai. He was awarded the national Scholarship from the Ministry of Culture, Government of India.

He has playbacked for several movies, and also playbacked for Webseries Tansener Tanpura. In 2014, as a playback singer he bagged two awards in the 4th Mirchi Music Awards Bangla for the Bengali film Pendulum. He has performed all over India and abroad.

Discography
 Subhah Shaam (2006)- classical
 Sur Sanchari (2007) - classical
 Kaalinaam Kalpotaru (2008) - devotional
 Tushar Dutta - Hindustani Vocal (2011)
 Raagas For Children (2011) - classical
 Biroohinee Chaand (2001) - semi classical
 Classical Trance of Tagore Songs (2012)
 Krishna Mantra (2012)) - devotional
 Tagore Trance (2013) - Tagore songs
 Durga (2013) - devotional
 Birohee (2014) - semi classical
 Gul Bagichaay (2014) - Nazrul Sangeet
 Suranjali (2015) - Nazrul Sangeet
 Saajan Aaore (2017) - classical
 Pragnya (Golden Swara) (2015) - classical
 Midnight Melody - classical 
 Saanjh Bhai - classical 
 Young Masters - classical
 Raag Rang (2017) - classical
 Sankalpana - classical 
 Sparkling Voice - classical 
 Sajan Aaayo Re - classical
 Ye Toh Karam Hain Maula - Sufi song  
 Flowering Buds (2006) - classical
 Majestic Essence - classical
 Bhor Bhayo - classical 
 Blessings - classical 
 Raagmala - classical 
 Morning Melody (2009) - classical
 Bhakti Raas - devotional 
 Bandish Fusion (2016) - Fusion 
 Bimona Bikel (2017) - "semi classical"
 Alimentic Records (Live in Nancy,2012) - classical 
 Amruthavarsha Vol 2,5 - devotional 
 Live in IGCC (In Bangladesh) - classical 
 Charan Mandir - devotional 
 Sadhguru Charan - devotional 
 Mystic Moods of Kolkata - classical 
 Live in India - The Baul & The Classicist 
 Heart Beat (2008) - Jazz fusion

References

Singers from Kolkata
Living people
20th-century Indian male classical singers
Hindustani singers
1969 births
21st-century Indian male classical singers